The Pillbox affair, also known as the Pillbox incident, was a military and political episode which occurred in Britain between November 1939 and January 1940 during the Second World War. The British War Minister, Leslie Hore-Belisha, visited France and the positions of the British Expeditionary Force (BEF) in mid-November.

Hore-Belisha and the commander of the BEF, General, later Field Marshal, John Vereker, 6th Viscount Gort, did not get along well together; Gort disliked Hore-Belisha for his colourful personality and unorthodox manner of conducting matters relating to the British Army, and the Minister rapidly came to recognise that.

During his visit, Hore-Belisha oversaw the placement of the troops of the BEF, not the defences being constructed. On his return to Britain, he complained to the War Cabinet and the Army Council that too few pillbox defences were being built for the BEF.

Gort and colleagues friendly to him were greatly angered by what they saw as this unjust and ill-founded criticism and began a campaign against Hore-Belisha, which culminated in January 1940 in Hore-Belisha's being dismissed from the post of War Minister. This campaign succeeded in large part due to antisemitism and class prejudice in both the Army and Parliament.

Notes

Sources

Political history of the United Kingdom
United Kingdom in World War II
Western European theatre of World War II
Politics of World War II
British World War II defensive lines